Kikoriki. Team Invincible (translit. Smeshariki Nachalo) is a 2011 Russian animated film which serves as a prequel to the Kikoriki series. The film was released in Russia on December 22, 2011. In the United Kingdom, it was released on February 10, 2012. In the United States, it was released in 2017 along with its sequel by Shout! Factory and Odin's Eye Entertainment.

Plot
While searching for a place to bury their time capsule, Krash and Chiko encounter a cave with the remains of a dinosaur and an old television set. When the cave begins to collapse, Krash and Chiko both escape with the set. The duo then demonstrates the television to the rest of their community members. After managing to start it up, the group begins to binge-watch programmes, in particular a superhero-action show named Lucien, named after the eponymous character who is battling an evil mastermind called Dr. Caligari, who is hell-bent on world domination. Believing the events of the show to be real, the group decides to go to the city where the events are apparently occurring and help fight injustice. Wally, who was left back at the island to look after it and turn on the lighthouse, joins them later. On their journey, the group's raft suffers a storm and is severely damaged, but by morning they find themselves in the city's waters and are taken in by the authorities.

While in custody, Carlin decides to send one of their own to inform Lucien. Each one of them picks a matchstick, and Wally is eventually deemed as the one who should be sent. The group also realises that Chiko is missing. Meanwhile, Chiko wakes up back at the raft, and wanders the city's streets. He is eventually taken in by Pin, a museum curator, who allows him to stay until his friends find him. Meanwhile, a series of robberies begins happening around the city.

The next morning, Wally escapes the hospital where his fellow group members are prepared to be vaccinated and goes to the channel's TV headquarters, where he encounters Barry, the actor portraying Lucien. Barry then announces his departure from the show to the show's announcer, Boss, who becomes outraged and replaces him with another actor. The whole group (save Chiko) encounter Barry, and ask him to help him in their fight against crime, but he denies that he is an actual superhero and tells them to leave him alone.

Meanwhile, Chiko and Pin are arrested by the police, as Chiko has dim-wittingly assisted robbers in stealing items from the museum, causing both to be branded as associates. They are both found guilty and sent to the city's prison, and the group is made aware about this. Krash, Dokko, Rosa, Wally, Carlin and Olga visit Barry in his apartment and attempt to convince him to save Chiko, referring to him as a fighter for justice. Berry lashes out at them, saying that the whole show and its characters are "made up". Wally confirms this to the group, saying that he is simply an actor. Devastated that their whole journey had all been for nothing, the group leaves Barry's apartment.

While devising a plan to break Chiko out, Barry arrives and tells them to come along with him. He takes the group to the apartment of Eugene, the actor portraying Caligari, whom he convinces to make a "real" plan "for a good deed". Eugene then devises the plan: Dokko (who is an electricity expert) and Carlin will go to the sewers underneath the prison and cut the power. Meanwhile Barry, Krash, Wally and Rosa will infiltrate the prison, with the latter two and Olga (who will remain at their getaway van) setting up the zipline for their escape, while Berry and Krash will rescue Chiko.

The plan goes well at first, and Chiko is freed. However, when he insists on breaking Pin out as well, Barry accidentally alerts the security camera guard when he frees Pin by pulling out the door with another door attached by a rope, which crashes into a guard's office and causes him to call for backup. The four flee by lift, but when a lightning strike causes all power to shut down and the lift to begin to plummet, the group escapes through the pipes leading to the roof.

Meanwhile, the new show, now called "Julien" is broadcast to a live audience, with Boss hosting. After the ad break, a footage is played which reveals that Boss is the one who sent the criminals to go on massive robbing sprees throughout the city, while a stunned Boss and audience watch on.

While attempting to zipline from the prison's roof, Barry almost falls to his death when the biplane is cut by a rogue zeppelin, which pursues him to the edge of the roof. Left with no other choice, Barry jumps inside the Zeppelin through its door. The group proceeds to pursue the zeppelin in their getaway van, but soon end up being pushed by it. Realising that the van is heading for a cliff, the group evacuates onto the zeppelin, and in the process Wally almost plummets with the van, but is caught by Rosa.

The group then struggles for control of the zeppelin, but eventually end up seeing their own lighthouse, into which they accidentally crash, sustaining several injuries. The next morning, the group leads Barry to his new house in a wheelchair, towards which he manages to walk on his own. Carlin, Dokko, Pin, Barry, Krash, Chiko, Rosa, Wally and Olga then proceed to photograph altogether in front of the house, setting up the events of Kikoriki, while Carlin and Dokko question whether Eugene (who stayed behind in the city) would avoid trouble from the law.

Cast
 Mikhail Chernyak as Dokko, Pin and Lucien a.k.a. Barry
 Sergey Mardar as Carlin, Olga and 2nd Robber
 Anton Vinogradov as Krash, 1st Robber, Radio DJ and 2nd TV announcer
 Vladimir Postnikov as Chiko
 Svetlana Pismichenko as Rosa
 Vadim Bochanov as Wally 
 Mikhail Khrustalyov as Dr. Caligari a.k.a. Eugene
 Stanislav Kontsevich as Boss
 Kseniya Brzhezovskaya as 1st TV announcer and Maria
 Vladimir Maslakov as Bull Cop and Prison Warden
 Elena Shulman as Nurse
 Alena Polikovskaya as Camel's wife and granny
 Sergey Vasilyev as Crocodile
 Igor Yakovel as Kikostankino's security
 Changir Suleymanov as Camel
 Oleg Kulikovich as Flamingo and Voice of "Jump to the Abyss"
 Valeriy Solovyov as Judge
 Andrey Lyovin as the 3rd TV announcer
 Nastya Pashenkova as Translator
 Denis Chernov as Homeless and Julien

Production and release
An initial budget of $1 million was given to produce a "test film" to show to international partners. According to Marmelad-media's general director Ilya Popov, the final budget would depend on a number of factors, such as whether it will be sold internationally (in which case the budget would be up to $15 million) or limited to Russia (in which case it will cost around $3–4 million). Popov considered spending anything over $5 million to be unprofitable (the highest-grossing Russian animated film to date, Ilya Muromets and Nightingale the Robber, cost $2.5 million and made just under $10 million; since around half of the profits usually go to the distributors, if it had cost over $5 million it would not have been profitable).

The film was released domestically in December 2011 in Russia, but received a limited release in the UK in February 2012. The film is considered a well thought-through prequel, its plot explaining events that brought the nine animal characters together in the first place.

References

External links
  
 

2011 animated films
2011 films
Russian animated films
Kikoriki
Russian children's fantasy films
Bazelevs Company films